British Airways (BA) is the flag carrier airline of the United Kingdom. It is headquartered in London, England, near its main hub at Heathrow Airport.

The airline is the second largest UK-based carrier, based on fleet size and passengers carried, behind easyJet. In January 2011 BA merged with Iberia, creating the International Airlines Group (IAG), a holding company registered in Madrid, Spain. IAG is the world's third-largest airline group in terms of annual revenue and the second-largest in Europe. It is listed on the London Stock Exchange and in the FTSE 100 Index. British Airways is the first passenger airline to have generated more than US$1 billion on a single air route in a year (from 1 April 2017, to 31 March 2018, on the New York-JFK - London-Heathrow route).

BA was created in 1974 after a British Airways Board was established by the British government to manage the two nationalised airline corporations, British Overseas Airways Corporation and British European Airways, and two regional airlines, Cambrian Airways and Northeast Airlines. On 31 March 1974, all four companies were merged to form British Airways. However, it marked 2019 as its centenary based on predecessor companies. After almost 13 years as a state company, BA was privatised in February 1987 as part of a wider privatisation plan by the Conservative government. The carrier expanded with the acquisition of British Caledonian in 1987, Dan-Air in 1992, and British Midland International in 2012.

It is a founding member of the Oneworld airline alliance, along with American Airlines, the now-defunct Canadian Airlines,  Cathay Pacific, and Qantas.  The alliance has since grown to become the third-largest, after SkyTeam and Star Alliance.

History

Proposals to establish a joint British airline, combining the assets of the British Overseas Airways Corporation (BOAC) and British European Airways (BEA) were first raised in 1953 as a result of difficulties in attempts by BOAC and BEA to negotiate air rights through the British colony of Cyprus. Increasingly BOAC was protesting that BEA was using its subsidiary Cyprus Airways to circumvent an agreement that BEA would not fly routes further east than Cyprus, particularly to the increasingly important oil regions in the Middle East. The chairman of BOAC, Miles Thomas, was in favour of a merger as a potential solution to this disagreement and had backing for the idea from the Chancellor of the Exchequer at the time, Rab Butler. However, opposition from the Treasury blocked the proposal.

Consequently, it was only following the recommendations of the 1969 Edwards Report that a new British Airways Board, managing both BEA and BOAC, and the two regional British airlines Cambrian Airways based at Cardiff, and Northeast Airlines based at Newcastle upon Tyne, was constituted on 1 April 1972. Although each airline's branding was maintained initially, two years later the British Airways Board unified its branding, effectively establishing British Airways as an airline on 31 March 1974.

Following two years of fierce competition with British Caledonian, the second-largest airline in the United Kingdom at the time, the Government changed its aviation policy in 1976 so that the two carriers would no longer compete on long-haul routes.

British Airways and Air France operated the supersonic airliner Aerospatiale-BAC Concorde, and the world's first supersonic passenger service flew in January 1976 from Heathrow Airport to Bahrain International Airport. Services to the US began on 24 May 1976 with a flight to Washington Dulles airport, and flights to New York JFK airport followed on 22 September 1977. Service to Singapore was established in co-operation with Singapore Airlines as a continuation of the flight to Bahrain. Following the Air France Concorde crash in Paris and a slump in air travel following the 11 September attacks in New York in 2001, it was decided to cease Concorde operations in 2003 after 27 years of service. The final commercial Concorde flight was BA002 from New York-JFK to London-Heathrow on 24 October 2003.

In 1981 the airline was instructed to prepare for privatisation by the Conservative Thatcher government. Sir John King, later Lord King, was appointed chairman, charged with bringing the airline back into profitability. While many other large airlines struggled, King was credited with transforming British Airways into one of the most profitable air carriers in the world. The flag carrier was privatised and was floated on the London Stock Exchange in February 1987. British Airways effected the takeover of the UK's "second" airline, British Caledonian, in July of that same year.

The formation of Richard Branson's Virgin Atlantic in 1984 created a competitor for BA. The intense rivalry between British Airways and Virgin Atlantic culminated in the former being sued for libel in 1993, arising from claims and counterclaims over a "dirty tricks" campaign against Virgin. This campaign included allegations of poaching Virgin Atlantic customers, tampering with private files belonging to Virgin, and undermining Virgin's reputation in the city. As a result of the case BA management apologised "unreservedly", and the company agreed to pay £110,000 in damages to Virgin, £500,000 to Branson personally and £3 million legal costs. Lord King stepped down as chairman in 1993 and was replaced by his deputy, Colin Marshall, while Bob Ayling took over as CEO. Virgin filed a separate action in the US that same year regarding BA's domination of the trans-Atlantic routes, but it was thrown out in 1999.

In 1992 British Airways expanded through the acquisition of the financially troubled Dan-Air, giving BA a much larger presence at Gatwick Airport. British Asia Airways, a subsidiary based in Taiwan, was formed in March 1993 to operate between London and Taipei. That same month BA purchased a 25% stake in the Australian airline Qantas and, with the acquisition of Brymon Airways in May, formed British Airways Citiexpress (later BA Connect). In September 1998, British Airways, along with American Airlines, Cathay Pacific, Qantas, and Canadian Airlines, formed the Oneworld airline alliance. Oneworld began operations on 1 February 1999, and is the third-largest airline alliance in the world, behind SkyTeam and Star Alliance.

Bob Ayling's leadership led to a cost savings of £750m and the establishment of a budget airline, Go, in 1998. The next year, however, British Airways reported an 84% drop in profits in its first quarter alone, its worst in seven years. In March 2000, Ayling was removed from his position and British Airways announced Rod Eddington as his successor. That year, British Airways and KLM conducted talks on a potential merger, reaching a decision in July to file an official merger plan with the European Commission. The plan fell through in September 2000. British Asia Airways ceased operations in 2001 after BA suspended flights to Taipei. Go was sold to its management and the private equity firm 3i in June 2001. Eddington would make further workforce cuts due to reduced demand following 11 September attacks in 2001, and BA sold its stake in Qantas in September 2004. In 2005 Willie Walsh, managing director of Aer Lingus and a former pilot, became the chief executive officer of British Airways. BA unveiled its new subsidiary OpenSkies in January 2008, taking advantage of the liberalisation of transatlantic traffic rights between Europe and the United States. OpenSkies flies non-stop from Paris to New York's JFK and Newark airports.

In July 2008, British Airways announced a merger plan with Iberia, another flag carrier airline in the Oneworld alliance, wherein each airline would retain its original brand. The agreement was confirmed in April 2010, and in July the European Commission and US Department of Transport permitted the merger and began to co-ordinate transatlantic routes with American Airlines. On 6 October 2010 the alliance between British Airways, American Airlines and Iberia formally began operations. The alliance generates an estimated £230 million in annual cost-saving for BA, in addition to the £330 million which would be saved by the merger with Iberia. This merger was finalised on 21 January 2011, resulting in the International Airlines Group (IAG), the world's third-largest airline in terms of annual revenue and the second-largest airline group in Europe. Prior to merging, British Airways owned a 13.5% stake in Iberia, and thus received ownership of 55% of the combined International Airlines Group; Iberia's other shareholders received the remaining 45%. As a part of the merger, British Airways ceased trading independently on the London Stock Exchange after 23 years as a constituent of the FTSE 100 Index.

In September 2010 Willie Walsh, now CEO of IAG, announced that the group was considering acquiring other airlines and had drawn up a shortlist of twelve possible acquisitions. In November 2011 IAG announced an agreement in principle to purchase British Midland International from Lufthansa. A contract to purchase the airline was agreed the next month, and the sale was completed for £172.5 million on 30 March 2012. The airline established a new subsidiary based at London City Airport operating Airbus A318s.

British Airways was the official airline partner of the London 2012 Olympic Games. On 18 May 2012 it flew the Olympic flame from Athens International Airport to RNAS Culdrose while carrying various dignitaries, including Lord Sebastian Coe, Princess Anne, the Olympics minister Hugh Robertson and the London Mayor Boris Johnson, along with the footballer David Beckham.

On 27 May 2017, British Airways suffered a computer power failure. All flights were cancelled and thousands of passengers were affected. By the following day, the company had not succeeded in reestablishing the normal function of its computer systems. When asked by reporters for more information on the ongoing problems, British Airways stated "The root cause was a power supply issue which our affected our IT systems - we continue to investigate this" and declined to comment further. Willie Walsh later attributed the crash to an electrical engineer disconnecting the UPS and said there would be an independent investigation.

Amidst the decline in the value of Iranian currency due to the reintroduction of US sanctions on Iran, BA announced that the Iranian route is "not commercially viable". As a result, BA decided to stop its services in Iran, effective 22 September 2018.

In 2018, British Airways partnered with British tailor and designer Ozwald Boateng to redesign the company's historic uniforms, in honour of its approaching centenary, creating a new look for BA, while adhering to its traditional style. The new collection "A British Original" was launched in 2023. This design initiative also included English bone china manufactured by William Edwards and cutlery by Studio William for the company's first class service.

In 2019, as part of the celebrations of a centenary of airline operations in the United Kingdom, British Airways announced that four aircraft would receive retro liveries. The first of these is a Boeing 747-400 (G-BYGC), which was repainted into the former BOAC livery, which it retained until its retirement. Two more Boeing 747-400s were repainted with former British Airways liveries. One wore the "Landor" livery until its retirement in 2020 (G-BNLY), the other (G-CIVB), wore the original "Union Jack" livery until its retirement in 2020 also. An Airbus A319 was repainted into British European Airways livery, which is still flying as G-EUPJ.

On 28 April 2020, the company set out plans to make up to 12,000 staff redundant because of the global collapse of air traffic due to the COVID-19 pandemic and that it may not reopen its operations at Gatwick airport. In July 2020, British Airways announced the immediate retirement of its entire 747-400 fleet, having originally intended to phase out the remaining 747s in 2024. The airline stated that its decision to bring forward the date was in part due to the downturn in air travel following the COVID-19 pandemic and to focus on incorporating more modern and fuel-efficient aircraft such as the Airbus A350 and Boeing 787. At the same time, British Airways also announced its intention to eliminate carbon emissions by 2050. On 28 July 2020, the company's cabin crew union issued an "industrial action" warning in order to prevent the 12,000 job cuts and pay cuts.

On 12 October 2020, it was announced that Sean Doyle, CEO of Aer Lingus (also part of the IAG airline group) would succeed Álex Cruz as CEO.

Corporate affairs

Operations

British Airways is the largest airline based in the United Kingdom in terms of fleet size, international flights, and international destinations and was, until 2008, the largest airline by passenger numbers. The airline carried 34.6 million passengers in 2008, but, rival carrier easyJet transported 44.5 million passengers that year, passing British Airways for the first time. British Airways holds a United Kingdom Civil Aviation Authority Type A Operating Licence, it is permitted to carry passengers, cargo, and mail on aircraft with 20 or more seats.

The airlines' head office, Waterside, stands in Harmondsworth, a village that is near Heathrow Airport. Waterside was completed in June 1998 to replace British Airways' previous head office, Speedbird House, located in Technical Block C on the grounds of Heathrow.

British Airways' main base is at Heathrow Airport, but it also has a major presence at Gatwick Airport. It also has a base at London City Airport, where its subsidiary BA Cityflyer is the largest operator. BA had previously operated a significant hub at Manchester Airport. Manchester to New York (JFK) services were withdrawn; later all international services outside London ceased when the subsidiary BA Connect was sold. Passengers wishing to travel internationally with BA either to or from regional UK destinations must now transfer in London. Heathrow Airport is dominated by British Airways, which owns 50% of the slots available at the airport as of 2019, growing from 40% in 2004. The majority of BA services operate from Terminal 5, with the exception of some flights at Terminal 3 owing to insufficient capacity at Terminal 5. At London City Airport, the company owns 52% of the slots as of 2019.

In August 2014, Willie Walsh advised the airline would continue to use flight paths over Iraq despite the hostilities there. A few days earlier Qantas announced it would avoid Iraqi airspace, while other airlines did likewise. The issue arose following the downing of Malaysia Airlines Flight 17 over Ukraine, and a temporary suspension of flights to and from Ben Gurion Airport during the 2014 Israel–Gaza conflict.

Subsidiaries

Over its history, BA has had many subsidiaries. In addition to the below, British Airways also owned Airways Aero Association, the operator of the British Airways flying club based at Wycombe Air Park in High Wycombe, until it was sold to Surinder Arora in 2007.

Franchises

Shareholdings
British Airways obtained a 15% stake in UK regional airline Flybe from the sale of BA Connect in March 2007. It sold the stake in 2014.

BA also owned a 10% stake in InterCapital and Regional Rail (ICRR), the company that managed the operations of Eurostar (UK) Ltd from 1998 to 2010, when the management of Eurostar was restructured.

Business trends
The key trends for the British Airways PLC Group are shown below.

On the merger with Iberia, the accounting reference date was changed from 31 March to 31 December; figures below are therefore for the years to 31 March up to 2010, for the nine months to 31 December 2010, and for the years to 31 December thereafter:

In 2020, due to the crisis caused by the COVID-19 pandemic, British Airways had to reduce its 42,000-strong workforce by 12,000 jobs. According to the estimate by IAG, a parent company, it will take the air travel industry several years to return to previous performance and profitability levels.

However, 2022 saw a dramatic increase in travel, and the company now faced a worker shortage, forcing it to cancel more than 1,500 flights. During February 2023, The international airlines group, the owners of British Airways announced that the group has returned to making an annual profit of €1.3 billion for the first time since the pandemic, following a €2.8 billion loss in 2021. The company warned that due to the surge in demand for flying this could lead to more disruption.

Industrial relations
Staff working for British Airways are represented by a number of trade unions, pilots are represented by British Air Line Pilots' Association, cabin crew by British Airlines Stewards and Stewardesses Association (a branch of Unite the Union), while other branches of Unite the Union and the GMB Union represent other employees. Bob Ayling's management faced strike action by cabin crew over a £1 billion cost-cutting drive to return BA to profitability in 1997; this was the last time BA cabin crew would strike until 2009, although staff morale has reportedly been unstable since that incident. In an effort to increase interaction between management, employees, and the unions, various conferences and workshops have taken place, often with thousands in attendance.

In 2005, wildcat action was taken by union members over a decision by Gate Gourmet not to renew the contracts of 670 workers and replace them with agency staff; it is estimated that the strike cost British Airways £30 million and caused disruption to 100,000 passengers. In October 2006, BA became involved in a civil rights dispute when a Christian employee was forbidden to wear a necklace bearing the cross, a religious symbol. BA's practice of forbidding such symbols has been publicly questioned by British politicians such as the former Home Secretary John Reid and the former Foreign Secretary Jack Straw.

Relations have been turbulent between BA and Unite. In 2007, cabin crew threatened strike action over salary changes to be imposed by BA management. The strike was called off at the last minute, British Airways losing £80 million. In December 2009, a ballot for strike action over Christmas received a high level of support, action was blocked by a court injunction that deemed the ballot illegal. Negotiations failed to stop strike action in March, BA withdrew perks for strike participants. Allegations were made by The Guardian newspaper that BA had consulted outside firms methods to undermine the unions: the story was later withdrawn. A strike was announced for May 2010, British Airways again sought an injunction. Members of the Socialist Workers Party disrupted negotiations between BA management and Unite to prevent industrial action. Further disruption struck when Derek Simpson, a Unite co-leader, was discovered to have leaked details of confidential negotiations online via Twitter. Industrial action re-emerged in 2017, this time by BA's Mixed Fleet flight attendants, whom were employed on much less favorable pay and terms and conditions compared to previous cabin staff who joined prior to 2010. A ballot for industrial action was distributed to Mixed Fleet crew in November 2016 and resulted in an overwhelming yes majority for industrial action. Unite described Mixed Fleet crew as on "poverty pay", with many Mixed Fleet flight attendants sleeping in their cars in between shifts because they cannot afford the fuel to drive home, or operating while sick as they cannot afford to call in sick and lose their pay for the shift. Unite also blasted BA of removing staff travel concessions, bonus payments and other benefits to all cabin crew who undertook industrial action, as well as strike-breaking tactics such as wet-leasing aircraft from other airlines and offering financial incentives for cabin crew not to strike. The first dates of strikes during Christmas 2016 were cancelled due to pay negotiations. Industrial action by Mixed Fleet commenced in January 2017 after rejecting a pay offer. Strike action continued throughout 2017 in numerous discontinuous periods, resulting in one of the longest running disputes in aviation history. On 31 October 2017, after 85 days of discontinuous industrial action, Mixed Fleet accepted a new pay deal from BA which ended the dispute.

Senior Leadership 

 Chairman: Sean Doyle (since April 2021)
Chief Executive: Sean Doyle (since October 2020)

List of Former Chairmen 

 Sir David Nicolson (1972–1975)
 Lord McFadzean of Kelvinside (1976–1979)
 Sir Ross Stainton (1979–1980)
 Lord King of Wartnaby (1981–1993)
 Lord Marshall of Knightsbridge (1993–2004)
 Sir Martin Broughton (2004–2013)
 Keith Williams (2013–2016)
Álex Cruz (2016–2021)

List of Former Chief Executives 
The position was formed in 1977.

 Sir Ross Stainton (1977–1979)
 Sir Roy Watts (1979–1983)
 Lord Marshall of Knightsbridge (1983–1995)
 Bob Ayling (1996–2000)
 Sir Rod Eddington (2000–2005)
 Willie Walsh (2005–2010)
 Keith Williams (2011–2016)
 Álex Cruz (2016–2020)

Destinations

British Airlines offers nonstop travel to 191 locations in 74 different countries. Glasgow, Edinburgh, and London are the three cities that British Airways most often connects passengers to.

British Airways serves over 170 destinations in 70 countries, including eight domestic and 26 in the United States.

Alliances 
British Airways co-founded the airline alliance Oneworld in 1999 with airlines American Airlines, Cathay Pacific and Qantas. British Airways is still currently a member of Oneworld.

Codeshare agreements
British Airways codeshares with the following airlines:

 Aer Lingus
 airBaltic
 Alaska Airlines
 American Airlines
 Bangkok Airways
 Cathay Pacific
 China Eastern Airlines
 China Southern Airlines
 Finnair
 Iberia
 Japan Airlines
 Kenya Airways
 LATAM Brasil
 LATAM Chile
 Loganair
 Malaysia Airlines
 Qantas
 Qatar Airways
 Royal Jordanian
 S7 Airlines
 TAAG Angola Airlines
 Vueling

Fleet

, the British Airways operates a fleet of 253 aircraft with 47 orders. BA operates a mix of Airbus narrow and wide-body aircraft, and Boeing wide-body aircraft, specifically the 777 and 787. In October 2020, British Airways retired its fleet of 747-400 aircraft. It was one of the largest operators of the 747, having previously operated the -100, -200, and -400 aircraft from 1974 (1969 with BOAC).

British Airways Engineering
The airline has its own engineering branch to maintain its aircraft fleet, this includes line maintenance at over 70 airports around the world. As well as hangar facilities at Heathrow and Gatwick airport it has two major maintenance centres at Glasgow and Cardiff Airports.

Marketing

Branding

The musical theme predominantly used on British Airways advertising has been "The Flower Duet" by Léo Delibes. This was first used in a 1984 advertisement directed by Tony Scott, in an arrangement by Howard Blake. It was reworked by Malcolm McLaren and Yanni for 1989's  iconic "Face" advertisement, and subsequently appeared in many different arrangements between 1990 and 2010. The slogan 'the world's favourite airline', first used in 1983, was dropped in 2001 after Lufthansa overtook BA in terms of passenger numbers. Other advertising slogans have included "The World's Best Airline", "We'll Take More Care of You", "Fly the Flag", and "To Fly, To Serve".

BA had an account for 23 years with Saatchi & Saatchi, an agency that created many of their most famous advertisements, including "The World's Biggest Offer" and the influential "Face" campaign. Saatchi & Saatchi later imitated this advert for Silverjet, a rival of BA, after BA discontinued their business activities. Since 2007, BA used Bartle Bogle Hegarty as its advertising agency.

In October 2022, BA launched a brand new ad campaign, titled "A British Original" produced by London-based Uncommon Creative Studio. This was to be another record-breaking campaign for its use of 500 unique executions along with a series of 32 short films, coinciding with the launch of Ozwald Boateng's new collection of uniform.

British Airways purchased the internet domain ba.com in 2002 from previous owner Bell Atlantic, 'BA' being the company's acronym and its IATA Airline code.

British Airways is the official airline of the Wimbledon Championship tennis tournament, and was the official airline and tier one partner of the 2012 Summer Olympics and Paralympics. BA was also the official airline of England's bid to host the 2018 Football World Cup.

High Life, founded in 1973, is the official in-flight magazine of the airline.

Safety video
The airline used a cartoon safety video from circa 2005 until 2017. Beginning on 1 September 2017 the airline introduced the new Comic Relief live action safety video hosted by Chabuddy G, with appearances by British celebrities Gillian Anderson, Rowan Atkinson, Jim Broadbent, Rob Brydon, Warwick Davis, Chiwetel Ejiofor, Ian McKellen, Thandie Newton, and Gordon Ramsay. A "sequel" video, also hosted by Chabuddy G, was released in 2018, with Michael Caine, Olivia Colman, Jourdan Dunn, Naomie Harris, Joanna Lumley, and David Walliams. The two videos are part of Comic Relief's charity programme.

Liveries, logos, and tail fins

The aeroplanes that British Airways inherited from the four-way merger between BOAC, BEA, Cambrian, and Northeast were temporarily given the text logo "British airways" but retained the original airline's livery. With its formation in 1974, British Airways' aeroplanes were given a new white, blue, and red colour scheme with a cropped Union Jack painted on their tail fins, designed by Negus & Negus. In 1984, a new livery designed by Landor Associates updated the airline's look as it prepared for privatization. For celebrating centenary, BA announced four retro liveries: three on Boeing 747-400 aircraft (one in each of BOAC, Negus & Negus, and Landor Associates liveries), and one A319 in BEA livery.

In 1997, there was a controversial change to a new Project Utopia livery; all aircraft used the corporate colours consistently on the fuselage, but tailfins bore one of multiple designs. Several people spoke out against the change, including the former prime minister Margaret Thatcher, who famously covered the tail of a model 747 at an event with a handkerchief, to show her displeasure. BA's traditional rival, Virgin Atlantic, took advantage of the negative press coverage by applying the Union flag to the winglets of their aircraft along with the slogan "Britain's national flagcarrier".

In 1999, the CEO of British Airways, Bob Ayling, announced that all BA planes would adopt the tailfin design Chatham Dockyard Union Flag originally intended to be used only on the Concorde, based on the Union Flag. All BA aircraft have since borne the Chatham Dockyard Union flag variant of the Project Utopia livery, except for the four retro aircraft.

Arms

In 2011, British Airways made a brand relaunch project, in which BA introduced a stylized, metallized version of arms by For People Design to be used along with its Speedmarque logo. This is used exclusively on aircraft, First Wing Lounge and advertisements.

Loyalty programmes
British Airways' tiered loyalty programme, called the Executive Club, includes access to special lounges and dedicated "fast" queues. BA also invites its top corporate accounts to join a "Premier" incentive programme. British Airways operates airside lounges for passengers travelling in premium cabins, and these are available to certain tiers of Executive Club members. First class passengers, as well as Gold Executive Club members, are entitled to use First Class Lounges. Business class passengers (called Club World or Club Europe in BA terms) as well as Silver Executive Club members may use Business lounges. At airports in which BA does not operate a departure lounge, a third party lounge is often provided for premium or status passengers. In 2011, due to the merger with Iberia, British Airways announced changes to the Executive Club to maximise integration between the airlines. This included the combination and rebranding of Air Miles, BA Miles and Iberia Plus points as the IAG operated loyalty programme Avios.

Inflight magazines
high life Magazine is British Airways' complimentary inflight magazine. It is available to all customers across all cabins and aircraft types.

high life shop Magazine is British Airways' inflight shopping magazine. It is available to all customers on all aircraft where the inflight shopping range can be carried.

First life is a complimentary magazine offered to all customers travelling in the First cabin. It has a range of articles including fashion, trends and technology with an upmarket target audience.

Business life is a complimentary magazine targeted at business travellers and frequent flyers. The magazine can be found in all short haul aircraft seat pockets, in the magazine selection for Club World customers and in lounges operated by British Airways.

Cabins and services

Short haul

Economy class
Euro Traveller is British Airways' economy class cabin on all short-haul flights within Europe, including domestic flights within the UK.
Heathrow and Gatwick-based flights are operated by Airbus A320 series aircraft. Standard seat pitch varies from 29" to 34" depending on aircraft type and location of the seat.

All flights from Heathrow and Gatwick have a buy on board system with a range of food designed by Tom Kerridge.
Food can be pre-ordered through the British Airways mobile application. Alternatively, a limited selection can be purchased on-board using credit and debit card or by using Frequent Flyer Avios points. British Airways is rolling out Wi-Fi across its fleet of aircraft with 90% expected to be Wi-Fi enabled by 2020.

Scheduled services operated by BA Cityflyer currently offer complimentary onboard catering. The service will switch to buy on board in the future.

Business class
Club Europe is the short-haul business class available on all short-haul flights. This class allows for access to business lounges at most airports and complimentary onboard catering. The middle seat of the standard Airbus configured cabin is left free. Instead, a cocktail table folds up from under the middle seat on refurbished aircraft. Pillows and blankets are available on longer flights.

In-flight

Mid-haul and long haul

First class
First is offered on all British Airways Airbus A380s, Boeing 777-300ERs, Boeing 787-9/10s and on some of the Boeing 777-200ERs. There are between eight and fourteen private suites depending on the aircraft type.

The exclusive Concorde Room lounge at Heathrow Terminal 5 offers pre-flight dining with waiter service and more intimate space. Dedicated British Airways 'Galleries First' lounges are available at some airports, and Business lounges are used where these are not available. Some feature a 'First Dining' section where passengers holding a first class ticket can access a pre-flight dining service.

Club World
Club World is the long-haul business class cabin. It is offered on all long-haul aircraft. The cabin features fully convertible flat bed seats. In March 2019, BA unveiled its new business-class seats on the new A350 aircraft, which feature a suite with a door. Since the unveiling, Club Suite has been installed on the Boeing 787-10 and retrofitted on some Boeing 777 cabins. The remaining aircraft are due to have their seats re-fitted over the coming years and they currently feature an older seat type, initially released in 2006.

World Traveller Plus
World Traveller Plus is the premium economy class cabin provided on all BA long haul aircraft. This cabin offers wider seats, extended leg-room, additional seat comforts such as larger IFE screen, a foot rest and power sockets. A complimentary 'World Traveller' bar is offered along with an upgraded main meal.

World Traveller
World Traveller is the mid-haul and long-haul economy class cabin. It offers seat-back entertainment, complimentary food and drink, pillows, and blankets. While the in-flight entertainment screens are available on all long-haul aircraft, international power outlets are available on the aircraft based at Heathrow. Wifi is also available on selected aircraft at an extra fee.

Incidents and accidents
British Airways is known to have a strong reputation for safety and has been consistently ranked within the top 20 safest airlines globally according to Business Insider and AirlineRatings.com.

Since BA's inception in 1974, it has been involved in three hull-loss incidents (British Airways Flight 149 was destroyed on the ground at Kuwait International Airport as a result of military action during the First Gulf War with no one on board) and two hijacking attempts. To date, the only fatal accident experienced by a BA aircraft occurred in 1976 with British Airways Flight 476 which was involved in a midair collision later attributed to an error made by air traffic control.

 On 22 November 1974, British Airways Flight 870 was hijacked shortly after take-off from Dubai International Airport for London-Heathrow. The Vickers VC10 landed at Tripoli for refuelling before flying on to Tunis. The captain, Jim Futcher, returned to the aircraft to fly it knowing the hijackers were on board. A hostage, 43-year-old German banker Werner Gustav Kehl, was shot in the back. The hijackers eventually surrendered after 84 hours. Futcher was awarded the Queen's Gallantry Medal, the Guild of Air Pilots and Air Navigators Founders Medal, the British Air Line Pilots Association Gold Medal and a Certificate of Commendation from British Airways for his actions during the hijacking.
 On 10 September 1976, a Trident 3B on British Airways Flight 476 departed from London-Heathrow to Istanbul. It collided in mid-air with an Inex Adria DC9-31 near Zagreb. All 54 passengers and 9 crew members on the BA aircraft died. This is the only fatal accident to a British Airways aircraft since the company's formation in 1974.
 On 24 June 1982, British Airways Flight 9, a Boeing 747-200 registration G-BDXH, flew through a cloud of volcanic ash and dust from the eruption of Mount Galunggung. The ash and dust caused extensive damage to the aircraft, including the failure of all four engines. The crew managed to glide the plane out of the dust cloud and restart all four of its engines, although one later had to be shut down again. The volcanic ash caused the cockpit window to be scratched to such an extent that it was difficult for the pilots to see out of the plane. However, the aircraft made a successful emergency landing at Halim Perdanakusuma International Airport just outside Jakarta. There were no fatalities or injuries.
 On 10 June 1990, British Airways Flight 5390, a BAC One-Eleven flight between Birmingham and Málaga, suffered a windscreen blowout due to the fitting of incorrect bolts the previous day. The captain sustained major injuries after being partially blown out of the aircraft, but the co-pilot landed the plane safely at Southampton Airport.
 On 2 August 1990, British Airways Flight 149 landed at Kuwait International Airport four hours after the Iraqi invasion of Kuwait. The aircraft, a Boeing 747-100 G-AWND, was destroyed, and all passengers and crew were captured. Two of the landing gears were salvaged, and are on display in Waterside, BA Headquarters in London.
 On 29 December 2000, British Airways Flight 2069 was en route from London to Nairobi when a mentally ill passenger entered the cockpit and grabbed the controls. As the pilots struggled to remove the intruder, the Boeing 747-400 stalled twice and banked to 94 degrees. Several people on board were injured by the violent manoeuvres, which briefly caused the aircraft to descend at 30,000 ft per minute. The man was finally restrained with the help of several passengers, and the co-pilot regained control of the aircraft. The flight landed safely in Nairobi.
 On 17 January 2008, British Airways Flight 38, a Boeing 777-200ER G-YMMM, from Beijing to London crash-landed approximately  short of Heathrow Airport's runway 27L, and slid onto the runway's displaced threshold. The aircraft sustained damage to its landing gear, wing roots, and engines, resulting in the first hull loss of a Boeing 777. There were no fatalities, but there was one serious injury and 12 minor injuries. The accident was caused by icing in the fuel system, resulting in a loss of power.
 On 24 May 2013, British Airways Flight 762, using an Airbus A319-131 and registered as G-EUOE, returned to Heathrow Airport after fan cowl doors detached from both engines shortly after takeoff. During the approach, a fire broke out in the right engine and persisted after the engine was shut down. The aircraft landed safely with no injuries to the 80 people on board. The accident report revealed that the cowlings had been left unlatched following overnight maintenance. The separation of the doors caused airframe damage and the right-hand engine fire resulted from a ruptured fuel pipe.
 On 22 December 2013, British Airways Flight 34, a Boeing 747-436 G-BNLL, hit a building at O. R. Tambo International Airport in Johannesburg after missing a turning on a taxiway. The starboard wing was severely damaged but there were no injuries amongst the crew or 189 passengers, however, four members of ground staff were injured when the wing smashed into the building. The aircraft was officially withdrawn from service in February 2014.
 On 8 September 2015, British Airways Flight 2276, a Boeing 777-236ER G-VIIO, aborted its takeoff at Las Vegas' McCarran International Airport due to an uncontained engine failure of its left (#1) General Electric GE90 engine, which led to a substantial fire. The aircraft was evacuated on the main runway. All 157 passengers and 13 crew escaped the aircraft, at least 14 people sustaining minor injuries.
 Between 21 August 2018 and 5 September 2018, hackers carried out a "sophisticated, malicious criminal attack" on the website of the airline. Around 380,000 transactions were affected by this web skimming attack. The company was subsequently fined £183 million (1.5% of turnover) in July 2019, by the Information Commissioner's Office, the highest ever fine handed by the ICO at the time of issuing.
 On 18 June 2021, a British Airways Boeing 787-8 G-ZBJB, had a nose landing gear collapse while on the tarmac at Heathrow Airport. A British Airways spokesperson confirmed that no passengers were on board the plane when the incident occurred.
 On 6 July 2022, British Airways Flight 820, an Airbus A320-232, caught fire as it was landing at Copenhagen Airport. Airport firefighters put out the fire. They had to use foam as well. People in the terminal buildings were able to record the footage. The plane was ferried back to London-Heathrow Airport on July 9.

See also 
 Air transport in the United Kingdom
 Plane Saver Credit Union
 Transport in the United Kingdom
 List of airlines of the United Kingdom

References

Bibliography
 
 
 
 
 
 
 
 Wood, Alan. "Airline at War: British Airways Goes to War". Air Enthusiast, No. 55, Autumn 1994, pp. 62–74.

External links 

 
 British Airways Heritage Collection

 
British companies established in 1974
Airlines based in London
Airlines established in 1974
Airlines of the United Kingdom
Association of European Airlines members
British Air Transport Association
British brands
Companies formerly listed on the London Stock Exchange
European Low Fares Airline Association
Former nationalised industries of the United Kingdom
Price fixing convictions